La Revolución World Tour is the fourth world tour by the reggaeton duo Wisin & Yandel to support their sixth studio album La Revolución. Consisted on three legs including 16 shows in the United States, the duo largest arena tour at the time. The tour was planned to end on December 6, 2009, in San Juan, Puerto Rico. However, the tour was expanded to 2010 due the high demand including a second arena leg in the United States. During the stop in Argentina and Puerto Rico, the concerts was recorded and later released as La Revolución: Live. Performing in big and large venues in Latin America, it was the duo most extense and successful tour.

Overview

Stage and design 
The duo stated that the stage in Puerto Rico, cost around US$100,000."The idea behind the theme was that this was a revolution in music," said lighting/scenic/video designer Todd Roberts of Visions Lighting LLC (Placenta, California), who worked with Wisin y Yandel's personal lighting designer/programmer David Ayala, video director Alfredo Cifredo and production manager Eggie Allende to design and create the set. "They wanted to the look of the stage to be real industrial. We used a lot of large oversized chain, and a lot of metals." As far as the lighting went, "they wanted it to look as big as possible," said Roberts, "with a small budget.

At Luna Park in Buenos Aires, the stage was 360. It was the first time in 27 years that an artist used type of stage. The last act to used at the venue was Frank Sinatra. Because this reason, the concert was named "La Revolución en 360".

Critical reception 
Sarah Godfrey from The Washington Post attended to the concert in Washington, D.C. at the Patriot Center and gave a positive review stating "the performance itself was mostly the pair asserting their own stardom".

Commercial reception and attendance 
Following the announce of the first leg in the United States, over 60% tickets were sold in the first weeks. Ticket prices were between $45 and $95. The concerts at New York, Los Angeles, Miami, San Francisco and Washington, D.C. were reported sold out. Due the high demand by the fans a second leg was announced, including the first concert in Canada which was sold out. In Mexico, the tour was a box office success and in Mexico City and second date were added at Palacio de los Deportes due the high demand. In Medellin, Colombia, local media reported an attendance around 12,000 fans. In Medonza, Argentina, it was around 10,000 and 12,000 in Tucuman. Over 50,000 fans showed of to the clousure. During the third leg in Latin America, over 100,000 were sold between Paraguay and Argentina. The concert in Pereira, Colombia sold over 16,000 Tickets sold. Wisin & Yandel were chosen to be the last and main act on the third and final day of Festival Presidente 2010 in Santo Domingo.

Tour dates

Box office data

Attendance

Notes

Cancelled concerts

References 

2010 concert tours